Bawa Karma is a 1997 Sri Lankan drama film directed by Dharmasiri Bandaranayake and co-produced by Ven. Vijayapura Pagngnananna Thero and Jayaratne Wadduwage for Samadhi Films. This film is the sequel of Bawa Duka. It stars Swarna Mallawarachchi, Jackson Anthony and Ravindra Randeniya in lead roles along with Kamal Addararachchi and W. Jayasiri. Music composed by Gunadasa Kapuge. It is the 886th Sri Lankan film in the Sinhala cinema. The film won a Special Jury Award for Direction and the Presidential Award for Best Screenplay.

Plot
The family continue their existence with Nona Hami the sole breadwinner. Her lost son Giran, who was believed to have drowned, appears one day with a pastor who had saved his life and is taking care of him. Giran, who calls himself Graham now, helps his family and village. The other children grow up. Muhandiram will finally meet his end at the hands one of Nona Hami's children.

Cast
 Swarna Mallawarachchi as Nona Hami 
 Jackson Anthony as Peduru 
 Ravindra Randeniya as Muhandiram 
 Hemasiri Liyanage as Nona Hami's father 
 Kamal Addaraarachchi as Appu
 Suvineetha Weerasinghe as Arachchi hamine
 Shyamalie Perera as Bema Nona
 Miyuri Samarasinghe as Peduru's mother
 Priyantha Wijeekoon
 W. Jayasiri
 J.H. Jayawardena
 Somy Rathnayake
 Simon Navagattegama
 Neil Allas
 Janaka Kumbukage
 Nilmini Buwaneka 
 Ishool Jowzee as child artist

References

External links
 

1997 films
1990s Sinhala-language films
1997 drama films
Sri Lankan drama films